Bonnie Vale is an abandoned goldfields townsite  north of Coolgardie in the Shire of Coolgardie in Western Australia.

History
The town was gazetted in 1897. It was apparently named after Bonnie, a prospector who picked up a  nugget here in May/June 1894.

It is famous as the site of the Varischetti mine rescue of 1907, when Italian gold miner Modesto Varischetti was trapped for nine days in a mine when it was flooded after a thunderstorm.  Varischetti survived in an air pocket until rescued.  A diver using deep-sea diving equipment located Varischetti five days after the mine was flooded, and provided him with food, candles and letters of encouragement.

Rail services
The Prospector service, which runs each way between East Perth and Kalgoorlie once or twice each day, stops at Bonnie Vale.

References

Ghost towns in Western Australia
Shire of Coolgardie